Joakim Karlsson may refer to:

 Joakim Karlsson (kickboxer), Swedish kickboxer
 Joakim Karlsson (footballer) (born 1989), Swedish footballer